The following lists events that happened during 1965 in the Republic of Congo.

Incumbents 
 President: Joseph Kasa-Vubu – Joseph-Désiré Mobutu
 Prime Minister: Moïse Tshombe – Évariste Kimba – Léonard Mulamba

Events

References

Sources

 
1960s in the Democratic Republic of the Congo
Years of the 20th century in the Democratic Republic of the Congo
Democratic Republic of the Congo
Democratic Republic of the Congo